VfL Oldenburg is a German sports club from the town of Oldenburg, Lower Saxony which is best known for its football team, which plays in the Niedersachsenliga, the fifth level of the German football league system. The club has over 2,000 members in nine different sports departments including handball, American football, badminton, athletics, gymnastics and volleyball.

History
VfL Oldenburg were relegated from the German fifth tier (Oberliga) in 2009–10. In 2013, they returned to the Oberliga Niedersachsen as Landesliga Weser-Ems champions. In 2018, the club achieved promotion to the Regionalliga Nord. It was relegated back to the Oberliga after the 2018–19 season.

In June 2021, it was announced that VfL Oldenburg had qualified for 2021–22 DFB-Pokal. The club was awarded the DFB-Pokal berth after a draw between the remaining participants of the Lower Saxony Cup, which had been abandoned amid the COVID-19 pandemic in Germany.

Local derby rivalry
VfL Oldenburg has a local derby rivalry with VfB Oldenburg.

Honours
 Verbandsliga Niedersachsen-West: 2008
 Landesliga Weser-Ems: 1984, 2004, 2013

References

External links
Official Website Sportsclub 
Official Football Website 
Team information at Fussballdaten
Official Website Oldenburg Knights (American football team) 

 
Football clubs in Germany
Association football clubs established in 1894
Football clubs in Lower Saxony
VfL
1894 establishments in Germany